The Geiselbach is a right tributary of the Kahl in the northern Spessart in Bavaria and Hesse, Germany. It is 5,2 km (3,2 mi) long and begins at the confluence of multiple headstreams in Geiselbach. The largest tributary is the Omersbach. It discharges near the Teufelsmühle ("Devil's Mill"). The Geiselbach flows through the Teufelsgrund ("Devil's Valley") to Hüttelngesäß and forms the border between Hesse and Bavaria. Near the village Brücken it empties into the Kahl.

Together with Westerbach, Sommerkahl and Reichenbach, the Geiselbach is one of the largest tributaries of the Kahl.

Tributaries 
 Omersbach (left)

Gallery

References 

Rivers of Bavaria
Rivers of Hesse
Rivers of the Spessart
Rivers of Germany